Michael Winger (born 1980) is the general manager of the Los Angeles Clippers.  He has held this role since 2017.

Early life and career 
Winger attended Miami University and the University of Toledo College of Law. As a visiting student at the University of Maryland Francis King Carey College of Law during his last year of law school, Winger served as an apprentice to renowned sports agent, Ron Shapiro. Winger supported Ron in the launch of SNI's (Shapiro Negotiations Institute) Sports Division and helped with research for Ron's book, Bullies, Tyrants, & Impossible People: How to Beat Them Without Joining Them. In 2005 and following law school and his work with Ron Shapiro, Winger became the director of basketball operations and team counsel for the Cleveland Cavaliers under Danny Ferry, who was general manager at the time. During his time with the Cavaliers, the team reached the Eastern Conference Finals twice, winning one of those series to advance to the NBA Finals in 2007. Winger worked with LeBron James, Shaquille O'Neal, Mo Williams, and Ben Wallace while with the Cavaliers. In 2010, Winger became the assistant general manager and team counsel for the Oklahoma City Thunder under GM Sam Presti.

During his tenure with the Oklahoma City Thunder, the team reached four Western Conference Finals which resulted in one NBA Finals appearance in 2012. Winger worked with three future MVP's in Kevin Durant, James Harden, and Russell Westbrook. Winger had many different responsibilities while with the Thunder, including selecting players in the draft, executing trades, and retaining and signing existing players and free agents. Some notable draft selections, include Mitch McGary, Reggie Jackson, Steven Adams, Andre Roberson, and Cameron Payne.

Los Angeles Clippers 
On August 23, 2017, Winger was hired as the general manager of the Clippers.

In April 2019, the Timberwolves were seeking an interview with Winger for their opening role as president of basketball operations, but he declined.

In July 2019, Winger helped construct a championship-caliber roster with the signing of Kawhi Leonard and trade for Paul George. Since their arrival, the team has reached one Western Conference Finals and achieved an above .500 record in each season since Winger arrived. At the 2020 trade deadline, Winger helped orchestrate a trade for Marcus Morris Sr. and acquired Reggie Jackson after the Pistons bought out his contract.

See also 
 List of National Basketball Association general managers

References 

Los Angeles Clippers executives
American basketball people
National Basketball Association general managers
Miami University alumni
University of Toledo College of Law alumni
University of Maryland Francis King Carey School of Law alumni
1980 births
Living people
Place of birth missing (living people)